Helena Lingham (born 22 September 1963 as Helena Svensson) is a Swedish female curler.

In 1998 she was inducted into the Swedish Curling Hall of Fame.

Teams

Women's

Mixed

References

External links
 
 

Living people
1963 births
Swedish female curlers
World curling champions
European curling champions
Swedish curling champions